This is the list of äkıms of Türkıstan Region that have occupied the post since 1992.

List of Äkıms

Şymkent Region (1992) 

 Mars Ürkımbaev (6 February 1992 – 6 July 1992)

South Kazakhstan Region (1992–2018) 

 Mars Ürkımbaev (6 July 1992 – 3 December 1993)
 Zauytbek Tūrysbekov (3 December 1993 – 9 December 1997) 
 Qalyq Abdullaev (9 December 1997 – 26 July 1999)
 Berdıbek Saparbaev (26 July 1999 – 30 August 2002)
 Bolat Jalqyşiev (30 August 2002 – 20 September 2006)
 Ömırzaq Şökeev (20 September 2006 – 28 August 2007)
 Nūrğali Äşım (28 August 2007 – 4 March 2009)
 Asqar Myrzahmetov (4 March 2009 – 8 August 2015)
 Beibıt Atamqūlov (8 August 2015 – 7 October 2016)
 Janseiıt Tüimebaev (7 October 2016 – 19 June 2018)

Türkıstan Region (2018–present) 

 Janseiıt Tüimebaev (19 June 2018 – 26 February 2019)
 Ömırzaq Şökeev (26 February 2019 – present)

References 

Government of Kazakhstan
Government of Kyrgyzstan
Turkistan Region